Akschindlium is a genus of flowering plants belonging to the family Fabaceae.

Its native range is Indo-China.

Species:

Akschindlium godefroyanum

References

Fabaceae
Fabaceae genera